Wheels on Meals is a 1984 Hong Kong martial arts action comedy film written and directed by Sammo Hung, with action choreographed by Jackie Chan. The film stars Jackie Chan, Sammo Hung, Yuen Biao, Lola Forner, Benny Urquidez and José Sancho. The film was shot in Barcelona, Spain.

The film was a box office hit in East Asia, including Japan where the film was released as Spartan X. The film was also well-received by critics for its comedy and action, particularly the final fight between Jackie Chan and Benny Urquidez, which is considered one of the greatest fight scenes of all time. Jackie Chan with his stunt team were nominated for Best Action Choreography, for both Wheels on Meals and Project A, at the 4th Hong Kong Film Awards, winning the award for Project A.

Wheels on Meals spawned the Spartan X franchise. In 1984, it was adapted into the video game Spartan X (released as Kung-Fu Master internationally), which laid the foundations for the beat 'em up genre of action games. The video game also had a sequel, Spartan X 2, and there was a Spartan X comic book series. The Spartan X franchise grossed an estimated total revenue of approximately  worldwide.

Plot
Thomas and David are cousins who run a fast food van in Barcelona. The food is delivered by Thomas, who rushes around the square on a skateboard. After fending off a biker gang they continue business as normal.

They pay a visit to David's father, who is in a mental institution, and bump into Sylvia, the daughter of David's father's girlfriend. Thomas encourages his cousin to try to ask her out on a date, but David chickens out of this, making the excuse she would have said no anyway.

Later that night, while at the van serving food, Thomas inadvertently bumps into Sylvia, who is pretending to be a prostitute. She is actually a pickpocket, and she robs a man in a bedroom and runs away to their fast food van.

Both Thomas and David are enamored by her, but after allowing her to stay in their apartment that night, they wake to find Sylvia and their money gone. The next day, they bump into Moby, a bumbling private investigator who is also tracking Sylvia. They later discover that Sylvia is the heir to a sizable inheritance that a criminal gang is trying to steal from her. When she is kidnapped, Thomas, David and Moby team up to save her, infiltrating the villains' castle and defeating them in a martial arts battle. The final scene of the film shows David, Thomas and Sylvia reunited. Sylvia asks for a summer job, and Moby asks David and Thomas if they wish to work as private detectives with him, which they refuse.

Cast
 Jackie Chan – Thomas
 Sammo Hung – Moby
 Yuen Biao – David
 Lola Forner – Sylvia
 Benny Urquidez – Thug #1
 Keith Vitali – Thug #2
 Herb Edelman – Henry Matt
 José Sancho – Mondale
 Susanna Sentís – Gloria
 Paul Chang – David's father
 Amparo Moreno - Susana
 Richard Ng – Mental Patient (Brilliant)
 John Shum – Mental Patient (Laughing)
 Wu Ma – Mental Patient (Clock)
 Lau Sau-leung – Mondale Punk
 Blackie Ko – Delinquent Biker
 Mars
 Stanley Fung

Production

Title
The film's title was supposed to be Meals on Wheels. Superstitious Golden Harvest executives however demanded the title change because their two previous films with titles that began with the letter 'M' – Megaforce and Menage A Trois – were both box office flops.

Casting
The three action stars, Yuen, Chan and Hung, are long time best friends and had been Peking Opera School colleagues in their youth. The release of Wheels on Meals came in the midst of their most prolific period working together as a trio. The three men had acted together on Chan's Project A and the first of Hung's original Lucky Stars trilogy, Winners and Sinners in 1983. Wheels on Meals was released in 1984, and a year later they were reunited twice more for the Lucky Stars semi-sequels My Lucky Stars and Twinkle, Twinkle Lucky Stars. This was something of a golden period for Hong Kong cinema-goers, as three of the nation's most beloved action stars performed together on screen.

The film also features cameo appearances from fellow Lucky Stars Richard Ng and John Shum as mental patients in the hospital attended by the father of Yuen's character.

Wheels on Meals was the first of two films which paired star Jackie Chan against former professional kickboxing champion Benny Urquidez (the other being the 1988 film Dragons Forever). Their fight in this film is typically regarded as one of the greatest on-screen martial arts fights ever performed. At one point in the final battle between the pair, a spin-kick performed by Urquidez is so quick that the resulting airflow extinguishes a row of candles. This is shown onscreen, with no cuts or trick photography.

Co-star Lola Forner appeared in another Jackie Chan film, Armour of God (1987).

Filming
Audio commentator Bey Logan explains why Sammo Hung decided to shoot the film outside of Hong Kong. By the time it was made in 1984, shooting in Hong Kong had become practically impossible – firstly, because the action stars had become so famous that they could not walk through the streets with impunity, and secondly due to the mounting difficulties in obtaining a permit from the government in order to film in Hong Kong. Bruce Lee had paved the way for Hong Kong filmmakers shooting abroad with the 1972 film Way of the Dragon, whose location filming was done in Italy, whereas the interiors had been shot at Golden Harvest studio.

When Hung took his cast and crew to Barcelona, he wanted to strongly establish the locations in Barcelona as real, and to avoid shooting interiors at Golden Harvest. In comparison to Hong Kong, the Spanish authorities were very cooperative in allowing the use of locations for filming, even for car chases and fight scenes.

Reception

Box office
During its Hong Kong theatrical run, Wheels on Meals grossed 21,465,013, becoming the fifth highest-grossing film of the year in Hong Kong. In Taiwan, where it ran during SeptemberOctober 1984, it became the third highest-grossing film of the year, earning  (US$601,075).

In Japan, where it released as Spartan X, it grossed , becoming the sixth highest-grossing foreign film of 1985. In South Korea, it was the second highest-grossing film of 1985, with 307,751 box admissions in Seoul, equivalent to an estimated .

Critical response
The film was generally well-received by critics. Jamie Havlin of Louder Than War called it "one of the most highly regarded martial-arts comedies ever made." Casimir Harlow of AVForums rated it 9 out of 10, calling it "a hugely fun, thoroughly imaginative and frequently action packed affair." Justin Bowyer of Empire rated it three out of five stars, praising the action and comedy while criticizing the lack of plot. David Rees of Asian Action Cinema rated it 8 out of 10, calling it "an altogether very enjoyable if at times silly romp." John Krewson of The A.V. Club said that, while not as good as "other films the three principals have made", "it's right at the top of Hong Kong cinema's second tier". David Poplar of The Digital Fix rated it 8 out of 10, describing it as a "vintage Jackie Chan slapstick comedy featuring some astonishing choreography".

The final fight between Jackie Chan and Benny Urquidez is considered one of the greatest fight scenes of all time. The climax leading up to that, involving Thomas climbing a Spanish castle to rescue Sylvia (with the help of Moby and David) and fighting enemies along the way, has been compared to Bruce Lee's Game of Death (1972).

Awards and nominations
1985 Hong Kong Film Awards:
Nominated: Best Action Choreography

Home release

On 30 January 2006, DVD was released in a two disc platinum edition at Hong Kong Legends in UK in Region 2.

Unlike the majority of Chan's later films, the standard DVD release of Wheels on Meals does not contain the usual outtakes over the final credits. However, a VHS release of the film did exist in the mid-1980s under the title Spartan X, which has the outtakes intact.

Spartan X franchise

Video games

The film was adapted into an arcade video game called Spartan X (the film's Japanese title), developed by Irem in 1984. It is a loose adaptation of the film's final part, which involves Thomas climbing the castle to rescue Sylvia. The game also borrows heavily from the Bruce Lee film Game of Death (1972). It was re-titled Kung-Fu Master for Western markets without using the film's license. The arcade game laid the foundations for the beat 'em up genre, and inspired Super Mario Bros. (1985), Street Fighter (1987), the French film Kung Fu Master (1988), and the Red Ribbon Army saga in the manga and anime series Dragon Ball.

The game was ported to the Famicom/NES console in 1985 as Spartan X in Japan, and released as Kung Fu in Western markets. The Famicom/NES version sold 3.5million cartridges, including 1.42million in Japan and 2.08million overseas.

The game had two sequels. Vigilante was released for arcades in 1988. Spartan X 2 was released in Japan for the Famicom console in 1991.

An image of Thomas, Chan's character in the film, was used in the title screen and cutscene of the 1995 unlicensed Super Famicom game Hong Kong 97 as the game's character, Chin, a fictional relative to Bruce Lee.

Comic books
Between 1997 and 1998, a series of Spartan X comic books were published. Three issues of Jackie Chan's Spartan X: The Armour of Heaven were published in 1997, and four issues of Jackie Chan's Spartan X: Hell Bent Hero For Hire were published in 1998.

See also
 Jackie Chan filmography
 Sammo Hung filmography
 Yuen Biao filmography

References

External links
Interview with Keith Vitali at cityonfire.com
 
 

1984 films
1980s action comedy films
1984 martial arts films
1980s Cantonese-language films
Films directed by Sammo Hung
Films set in Barcelona
Golden Harvest films
Hong Kong action comedy films
1980s martial arts comedy films
Hong Kong martial arts comedy films
1984 comedy films
1980s Hong Kong films